Sir Peter John Derham,  (21 August 1925 – 24 September 2008) was an Australian business executive and philanthropist.

Derham graduated from the University of Melbourne with a BSc in 1959. He is a former resident of Ormond College and International House. In 1940 he joined the forces and served as a member of the Royal Australian Navy from 1945 to 1946.

In 1980, Derham was knighted for his service to industry, including tourism and science. He has been heavily involved in the preservation and restoration of heritage sites, including Mawson's Huts, in Antarctica and sat on a number of prominent charity boards including the Alfred Hospital, Breast Cancer Network, Australian Koala Foundation and the Australian Childhood Foundation. In 1989 Derham and his wife Lady Derham established the renowned Red Hill Estate winery on the Mornington Peninsula.

In 2001, Derham was awarded the Companion of the Order of Australia (AC) for service as an innovator in tourism development, commerce and science, to the community and to the preservation of heritage sites in the Antarctic. At 80 years of age and after 21 years, Derham stood down from Circadian Technologies (ASX:CIR) as the founding chairman.

He died at Cabrini Hospital following a stroke, aged 83.

References

1925 births
2008 deaths
University of Melbourne alumni
Australian Knights Bachelor
Companions of the Order of Australia
20th-century Australian businesspeople